Congiopodidae, commonly known as pigfishes, horsefishes and racehorses, is a family of ray-finned fish classified with in the order Scorpaeniformes. These fishes are native to the Southern Hemisphere.

Taxonomy
Congiopodidae was first formally recognised as a family by the American biologist Theodore Gill in 1889. The 5th edition of Fishes of the World classifies the family within the suborder Scorpaenoidei which in turn is classified within the order Scorpaeniformes. Other authorities place the Scorpaenoidei within the Perciformes. The monophyly of the Congiopodidae as set out in Fishes of the World is not universally agreed upon. Some authorities classify the genus Perryena in its own subfamily, Perryeninae, in the stonefish family Synanceiidae. The genera Alertichthys and Zanclorhynchus are classified within the family Zanclorhynchidae leaving Congiopodus as the only genus in the monotypic Congiopodidae. The name of the family is based on that of the genus Congiopodus, the derivation of which was not explained by its author, the English naturalist George Perry, but may be a combination of the Greek gongulos, meaning "round", and podus, which means "foot", maybe referring to the roundish pelvic fins of the type species C. percatus (now C. torvus).

Genera
Congiopodidae contains the following 4 genera:
 Alertichthys Moreland, 1960
 Congiopodus Perry, 1811
 Perryena Whitley, 1940
 Zanclorhynchus Günther, 1880

Characteristics
Congiopididae is characterised by having no scales on the body and head, although the skin may have a grainy texture. There is one nostril on each side of the relatively long snout  with a small mouth. The bill slit is rather small and is located above the base of the pectoral fin and the lateral line is typically well developed. The dorsal fin is continuous, except in Zanclorhynchus, and has between 8 and 21 spines and 8 and 14 soft rays. The anal fin contains between 0 and 3 spines and 5 to 10soft rays.

Distribution and habitat

Biology
One Congiopodid, Congiopodus peruvianus, is found in the shallow South American waters. In this species the adult's dorsal fin is relatively shorter than the juvenile's fin, but they all resemble yellow and orange dead tree leaves.

See also
 List of fish families

References

 
Ray-finned fish families
Scorpaenoidei
Taxa named by Theodore Gill